James Leigh Joynes (29 May 1854 – 13 January 1893) was an English journalist, writer, poet and socialist activist.

Biography
Joynes was born in Eton, Berkshire, the son of the Rev. James Leigh Joynes, Lower Master of Eton College. He was educated at Eton and matriculated at King's College, Cambridge in 1871, graduating B.A. in 1875. In 1876, he returned to Eton, teaching classics: he attracted criticism for his vegetarianism and habit of riding a tricycle. It was there he became friends with fellow vegetarian Henry S. Salt, who would go on to marry his sister Catherine Leigh Joynes, in 1879.

In 1882, he read Progress and Poverty, and this inspired him to work with its author, Henry George. The two travelled to Ireland to investigate land ownership there, and were both convicted and imprisoned under the Coercion Act. Joynes wrote a letter to The Times about this, followed by a book, Adventures of a Tourist in Ireland. Eton's headmaster ordered Joynes to suppress the book, which he initially agreed, but then regretted and instead resigned from the school.

At the end of 1882, George found Joynes work as a journalist for the Irish World. He moved to London, where he was a founder of the Land Reform Union, and became joint editor of its newspaper, the Christian Socialist. He also joined the Fellowship of the New Life, and the Social Democratic Federation (SDF), becoming co-editor of Today, its monthly magazine, and serving on its executive committee. In 1884, he spent time working in Germany, and so resigned his editorial posts, thereby missing out on involvement in the major split in the SDF.

Joynes returned to London in 1886, writing Songs of a Revolutionary Epoch about the German poetry of 1848, and training as a doctor at Middlesex Hospital. He began suffering from heart disease, and in poor health, he retired to West Hoathly, where he wrote poetry.

Joynes died in January 1893, in West Hoathly.

Bibliography

Books

Pamphlets

References

Further reading

External links 

 Biography of James Leigh Joynes
 James Leigh Joynes Bibliography

1854 births
1893 deaths
Alumni of King's College, Cambridge
19th-century British journalists
19th-century English poets
19th-century English writers
English Christian socialists
Georgists
Members of the Fabian Society
People educated at Eton College
People from Eton, Berkshire
Social Democratic Federation members